Parry County is one of the 141 Cadastral divisions of New South Wales. It is bounded by the Peel River and Cockburn River on the north, near Tamworth. The Moonbi Range is on the eastern boundary, and the Peel Range on the western boundary. The Great Dividing Range is the boundary to the south-east. It includes the towns of Dungowan, Ogunbil, Woolomin, Loomberah, Piallamore and Nundle.

Parry County was named in honour of Sir William Edward Parry, Commissioner for the Australian Agricultural Company, who selected the area within the county which was granted to what was then called the Peel River Company.

Parishes within this county
A full list of parishes found within this county; their current LGA and mapping coordinates to the approximate centre of each location is as follows:

See also 
 List of reduplicated Australian place names

References 

Counties of New South Wales